Torchwood is a British science fiction television programme created by Russell T Davies. A spin-off from the 2005 revival of long-running science fiction programme Doctor Who, Torchwood aired four series between 2006 and 2011. The show shifted its broadcast channel each series to reflect its growing audience, moving from BBC Three to BBC Two to BBC One, and acquiring US financing in its fourth series when it became a co-production of BBC One and Starz. In contrast to Doctor Who, whose target audience includes both adults and children, Torchwood is aimed at an older audience. Over its run, the show explored a number of themes; prominent among these were existentialism, homosexual and bisexual relationships, and explorations of human corruptibility.

Series overview

Episodes

Series 1 (2006–07) 
Series 1 focuses on Gwen Cooper, her introduction to Torchwood, and meeting Jack Harkness; as well as introducing the characters of Owen Harper, Ianto Jones, Susie Costello, and Toshiko Sato (who was previously introduced in the first series of the newly revived Doctor Who). There is also a loose plot arc centring around the rift; Owen's love of Diane, a woman lost in time; and Owen and Gwen's affair, as well as her relationship to her boyfriend Rhys.

Series 2 (2008) 
Series 2 focuses on the disappearance of Jack and his subsequent return, as well as his past; and also introduces the mysterious yet dangerous character named John Hart. Episodes 6-12 were all shown on BBC Three a week before their BBC Two broadcast.

Series 3: Children of Earth (2009) 

Series 3 centres around the 456, a mysterious alien race who make contact to Earth via the world’s children, and presents a version of events of how the world’s government would react to solve the problem. It also focuses on Jack and Ianto’s relationship, as well as Gwen and Rhys.

Series 4: Miracle Day (2011) 

Series 4 centres on an event called Miracle Day, where everyone in the world stops dying and subsequently becomes immortal. It also focuses on Jack’s past, his immortality, as well as Gwen and Rhys’s relationship. It also introduces new characters such as Rex Matheson, Esther Drummond, and Oswald Danes.

Ratings

Notes

See also 

 List of Doctor Who episodes (1963–1989)
 List of Doctor Who episodes (2005–present)
 K-9 and Company
 List of The Sarah Jane Adventures serials
 List of K-9 episodes
 List of Class episodes
Torchwood Declassified

References

External links 
 Official Website at BBC
 Official Website at Starz

 
Episodes
Torchwood
Torchwood